Shamil Magomedovich Omarov (September 28, 1936, in Dagestan, Soviet Union - 2020) was a Russian pharmacologist, Doctor of Medical Sciences, Distinguished Professor of the Dagestan State Medical University (since 2013), Member of the National Academy of Sciences of the Dagestan, Chairman of the Society of Pharmacologists of the Dagestan, Member of the Russian Union of Writers.
Honored Scientist of the Dagestan (1990).
In 2016, in the Dagestankaya Pravda named him "The Leader of Dagestan pharmacology and apitherapy".

Life
Omarov was born in Dagestan (was under Soviet Union), and was educated there. He graduated from the Dagestan State Medical Institute in 1961, and earned his Candidat degree in 1969 from N. I. Lobachevsky State University of Nizhny Novgorod. He was a student of Nikolay Artemov.

In 1980, he defended his doctoral thesis in the RUDN University, Moscow, and received the designation of professor.
Since 1988, he heads the Department of Pharmacology at the Dagestan State Medical University.
He was appointed Soros Professor.

Omarov is the author of 15 monographs and more than 400 scientific articles. He is the author of books (in Russian) including "Apitherapy in medicine" (2012), "Apiphytocosmetics for health" (2016), and "Encyclopedia of Apitherapy" (2016).

Non-university activities
Chairman of the Society of Pharmacologists of Dagestan
1989 - member of the International Committee of Apimondia
2002 - consultant of the American Biographical Institute for Apitherapy

Family
Omarov has three children, one daughter and two sons.

Honours and awards
 Veteran of Labour
 Honored Scientist of the Dagestan (1990)
 Nikolai Kravkov Russian Academy of Medical Sciences Medal (2012)
 Medal of Merit of the Dagestan State Medical University (2010)
 Medal "For the Development of Virgin Lands" (1957)

References

External links
 Dagestan State Medical University (in Russian)
 Омаров Шамиль Магомедович (к 70-летию со дня рождения) / Президиум правления РНОФ, Даг. отд. РНОФ, редколлегия журнала, Президиум РС МАН, Президиум НАН РД, ректорат ДГМА и др. // Экспериментальная и клиническая фармакология. 2006. Т. 69. No. 5. С. 79–80.
 Шамиль Магомедович Омаров (к 75-летию со дня рождения) / Президиум правления РНОФ, редколлегия журнала, НАН РД, ДГМА и др. // Экспериментальная и клиническая фармакология. 2011. Т. 74. No. 9. С. 46.
 Известному дагестанскому фармакологу и апитерапевту — 80 лет // Общественно-политический еженедельник «Молодёжь Дагестана», 23.09.2016.

1936 births
2020 deaths
People from Gunibsky District
Russian pharmacologists
Apitherapists
Soviet professors
Russian professors